Lions River is a town in uMngeni Local Municipality in the KwaZulu-Natal province of South Africa, situated between Lidgetton and Howick in the center of the KwaZulu-Natal Midlands. Its name originates from the last lion which was shot in the area in 1856.

Lions River is a rural town on the Midlands Meander route, situated within the Dargle Valley. The  area is well known for farming, particularly dairy. Within the town itself, the Lions River Trading Post is the most popular attraction.

References

Populated places in the uMngeni Local Municipality